Michael & Miranda is the debut album by English post-punk/new wave band The Passions, released on 18 April 1980 by Fiction Records.

The album was reissued on CD in November 2015 by Cherry Red Records and included three bonus tracks, first released in 1979 as non-album singles. The album was reviewed by Louder Than War where reviewer Ian Canty stated "Think you've heard the best sounds of 1980 Post Punk has to offer - if you haven't heard this think again". Record Collector magazine reviewed the album stating "Sparse and jagged, topped with sometimes angry, sometimes hauntingly ethereal vocals, it was typically and satisfyingly clever post-punk". Goldmine magazine in January 2016 recommended as Buy in their Quick Picks section.

Track listing 

2015 CD bonus tracks:

Personnel 
The Passions

 Barbara Gogan – vocals, guitar, piano
 Claire Bidwell – vocals, bass
 Clive Timperley – vocals, guitar, keyboards, violin, marimba
 Richard Williams – drums, percussion

Technical

 Mike Hedges, Michael J. Dutton – engineers
 Mark Freegard – assistant engineer
 Mike Laye – cover photography
 Recorded at Morgan Studios, London
 Mastered at The Penthouse, Abbey Road Studios, London
 CD remastered by Dave Turner

References 

Fiction Records albums
1980 debut albums
Albums recorded at Morgan Sound Studios
The Passions (British band) albums